This is the list of the number-one albums of the UK Compilation Chart during the 1980s.  A total of 15 different albums reached number one on the chart during the decade. From 14 January 1989, sales of Various Artists albums were excluded from the main UK Album Chart and used instead to compile the new Compilation Albums Chart.

Number-one albums

References

External links
Compilation Albums Top 40 at the Official Charts Company
The Official UK Compilation Chart at MTV
UK Top 40 Compilation Albums at BBC Radio 1

1980s in British music
United Kingdom Compilation Chart
Compilation 1980s